Cornelius McNamara, better known as Connie (Mackey) Mc Namara, (6 April 1896 – 15 December 1957) was the Captain of "A" Company Active Service Unit of the Second Battalion Mid Limerick Brigade in the Irish Republican Army during the Irish War of Independence.

Early life
Cornelius McNamara was born in Limerick city, the son of a butcher. He was educated for a period in the Christian Brothers School in Sexton Street, Limerick. He left the school around 1910 and took up an apprenticeship in one of the four large bacon factories in Limerick. When Padraig Pearse and Roger Casement came to Limerick in early 1914 to raise Volunteer companies, the seeds were planted in Cornelius' mind to join the movement later on.

Volunteers
In October 1915, he enlisted in "C" Company Limerick City Battalion under Michael Colivet, and was present at Killonan with the rest of his battalion during the Easter Rising, but after hearing word that the Rising was called off, the battalion marched back to Limerick. Soon after, the Battalion split and he then joined "A" Company of the newly formed Second Battalion. His home then became the battalion dispatch centre and he was admitted to the ranks of the Irish Republican Brotherhood. In November 1918 he was promoted to first Lieutenant.

War of Independence
When the Irish War of Independence started on 6 April 1919, Cornelius became part of 'A' Company's Active Service Unit. On the same day, he was part of the attempted rescue of Robert Byrne, Adjutant of the Second Battalion from the City Home in Limerick. Byrne was mortally wounded and became the first Republican fatality of the Irish War of Independence. He was promoted to Captain in November 1919 and became leader of the 'A' Company Active Service Unit. On 17 July 1920, he was arrested with 4 or 5 members of his ASU collecting funds in Garryowen. He was imprisoned until mid-February 1921 and was re-arrested soon after his release and remained in prison until 9 December 1921 where he was released under a general amnesty of the Anglo-Irish Treaty of 6 December 1921.

Civil War
McNamara fought on the Republican side in the Irish Civil War (1922–1923). He was made commandant of the Strand Barracks in Limerick in March 1922.

From 15 to 20 July, the Barracks was attacked by Free State troops under Michael Brennan. After a five-day siege, he surrendered and was imprisoned in Limerick Prison and then transported by the ship Arvonia to be interned in Gormanston Internment Camp. While he was in Limerick prison and aboard the Arvonia he was elected prisoners' commandant.

Subsequent IRA career
After the defeat of the anti-Treaty Irish Republican Army (IRA) in the Civil War, McNamara was released on 23 December 1923. He became secretary of the Limerick branch for the Irish Republican Prisoners' Dependents Fund (IRPDF) from 1924 to 1925, which assisted Republican Prisoners families. He was forced to emigrate to New York City in both 1925 and 1930 by Free State sympathisers, and took no further part in any more IRA activities.

Death

He died at home in 1957 and was survived by his second wife May (née Moakley) and only daughter Patricia Corbett. His grandson Jim Corbett chronicled his life with the biography Not While I Have Ammo.

See also
 Strand Barracks
 Gormanston Aerodrome
 Irish Republican Army
 Irish Civil War

References

Military personnel from County Limerick
1957 deaths
1896 births
Members of the Irish Republican Brotherhood
Irish Republican Army (1919–1922) members
People of the Irish Civil War (Anti-Treaty side)
Irish emigrants to the United States